Edilberto Romero is a Puerto Rican politician and the current mayor of Culebra. Romero is affiliated with the New Progressive Party (PNP) and has served as mayor since 2021.

References

Living people
Mayors of places in Puerto Rico
Popular Democratic Party (Puerto Rico) politicians
People from Culebra, Puerto Rico
Year of birth missing (living people)